Peter Gould is an American television writer, director and producer. He worked on all five seasons of the AMC drama Breaking Bad. He was nominated for four Writers Guild of America (WGA) Awards for his work on the series. After Breaking Bad ended, he went on to become the co-creator and co-showrunner, with Breaking Bad creator Vince Gilligan, of the show's spinoff, Better Call Saul. He became the series' sole showrunner after Gilligan left the writers room.

Education
Gould is a native of New York. His parents were both artists and met at art school. Speaking of his education, he admits "I was a bad speller. I had terrible handwriting. Doing papers in school was agonizing for me." He graduated from Sarah Lawrence College in 1982 with a Bachelor of Arts degree in English. In 1990, he graduated from the University of Southern California with a Master of Fine Arts.

Career
After graduating from college, he did commercials in New York for a while before entering USC Film School.

In 2008, he joined the writing staff of the first season of Breaking Bad as a story editor. He wrote the first-season episode "A No-Rough-Stuff-Type Deal". The first season writing staff was nominated for the Writers Guild of America (WGA) Award for best new series at the February 2009 ceremony.

Gould was promoted to executive story editor for the second season. He wrote the second-season episodes "Bit by a Dead Bee" and "Better Call Saul". The writing staff was nominated for the WGA award for best drama series at the February 2010 ceremony for their work on the second season. Gould was promoted to producer for the third season and wrote the episode "Caballo sin Nombre" and co-wrote the episode "Kafkaesque" with fellow producer George Mastras. Gould was promoted again to supervising producer for the fourth season in 2011.

In 2011, he wrote the HBO television film Too Big to Fail based on Andrew Ross Sorkin's book of the same name chronicling the events of the 2008 financial crisis and the collapse of Lehman Brothers from the point of view of Wall Street CEOs and US government regulators.

With Gilligan, he became co-creator and co-showrunner of the spinoff series, Better Call Saul. The show debuted on February 8, 2015, and was the highest-rated cable television series premiere to date. Gould would become the series sole showrunner after Gilligan left the writing staff early in the third season to focus on other projects. This transition had been planned since the show's debut. 

The episode "Uno" from the first season of Better Call Saul won the 2015 Writers Guild of America award for Best Dramatic Episode in February 2016. The episode was written by Gould and Gilligan.

In 2017, Better Call Saul was honored with a Peabody Award for "developing its own unique tone mixing legal drama, crime thriller, and dark comedy."

Filmography
Screenplays

Writer

Production staff

References

External links
 
 

American television writers
American male television writers
American television producers
American television directors
Sarah Lawrence College alumni
USC School of Cinematic Arts alumni
Year of birth missing (living people)
Living people